"Going Home: Theme of the Local Hero" is an instrumental rock track by Mark Knopfler, and the closing track from the 1983 film Local Hero soundtrack. It was the debut solo single by Knopfler, and charted at #56 in the UK, at #26 in the Netherlands and at #18 in New Zealand. The soundtrack album also features a reprise called "Wild Theme", which consists of Knopfler’s acoustic guitar interpretation of the song's melody. Despite its rather modest chart position in Knopfler's native UK, "Going Home" remains one of Knopfler's most popular songs. The saxophone piece was played by the American jazz saxophonist Michael Brecker. The song is popular among fans of English football, in particular those of Knopfler’s home town club, Newcastle United, as it is played as the team runs out before every home game.

Other releases
Besides its popularity in Knopfler's solo live set, "Going Home" had become a live staple also for Dire Straits, entering the band's repertoire since its release, and indeed the song's popularity grew thanks to its inclusion in the live album Alchemy: Dire Straits Live. The studio version of the song was included on the 1993 solo compilation Screenplaying (which also included "Wild Theme") and on the 2005 compilation Private Investigations: The Best of Dire Straits & Mark Knopfler, both on the single disc and double disc edition. The live version of the song only on guitar, credited as "Wild Theme", was included on Sultans of Swing: The Very Best of Dire Straits.

Charts
UK: 56
Netherlands: 26
New Zealand: 18

References

1983 songs
1980s instrumentals
Songs written by Mark Knopfler
Mark Knopfler songs